Viktoria Leks (born September 28, 1987) is an Estonian high jumper and National Indoor Champion 2006–2007.

She competed at the 2007 European Indoor Championships without reaching the final round.

Her personal best outdoor jump is 1.89 metres, achieved in June 2007 in Türi and indoor 1.91 (this was the national record this time), achieved in February 2007 in Tallinn.

Achievements

References

1985 births
Living people
Estonian female high jumpers